Winslow Lovejoy was a college football player. He was a prominent center for the Yale Bulldogs, captain of the 1924 team.

References

American football centers
All-American college football players
Yale Bulldogs football players